The 2023 Supercopa do Brasil (officially the Supercopa Betano do Brasil 2023 for sponsorship reasons) was the sixth edition of Supercopa do Brasil, an annual football match played between the champions of the Campeonato Brasileiro Série A and Copa do Brasil.

The match was played on 28 January 2023 between Palmeiras and Flamengo, who qualified after winning the 2022 Campeonato Brasileiro Série A and the 2022 Copa do Brasil, respectively. On 11 January 2023, the CBF announced that the match would be hosted at Arena BRB Mané Garrincha in Brasília.

Palmeiras won the match 4–3 to claim their first ever title in the tournament.

Qualified teams

Match

Details

References 

Supercopa do Brasil
2023 in Brazilian football
Sociedade Esportiva Palmeiras matches
CR Flamengo matches
Supercopa do Brasil